In probability theory, a standard probability space, also called Lebesgue–Rokhlin probability space or just Lebesgue space (the latter term is ambiguous) is a probability space satisfying certain assumptions introduced by Vladimir Rokhlin in 1940. Informally, it is a probability space consisting of an interval and/or a finite or countable number of atoms.

The theory of standard probability spaces was started by von Neumann in 1932 and shaped by Vladimir Rokhlin in 1940. Rokhlin showed that the unit interval endowed with the Lebesgue measure has important advantages over general probability spaces, yet can be effectively substituted for many of these in probability theory. The dimension of the unit interval is not an obstacle, as was clear already to Norbert Wiener. He constructed the Wiener process (also called Brownian motion) in the form of a measurable map from the unit interval to the space of continuous functions.

Short history 
The theory of standard probability spaces was started by von Neumann in 1932 and shaped by Vladimir Rokhlin in 1940.

Nowadays standard probability spaces may be (and often are) treated in the framework of descriptive set theory, via standard Borel spaces, see for example . This approach is based on the isomorphism theorem for standard Borel spaces . An alternate approach of Rokhlin, based on measure theory, neglects null sets, in contrast to descriptive set theory.
Standard probability spaces are used routinely in ergodic theory,

Definition 
One of several well-known equivalent definitions of the standardness is given below, after some preparations. All probability spaces are assumed to be complete.

Isomorphism 
An isomorphism between two probability spaces ,  is an invertible map  such that  and  both are (measurable and) measure preserving maps.

Two probability spaces are isomorphic if there exists an isomorphism between them.

Isomorphism modulo zero 
Two probability spaces ,  are isomorphic  if there exist null sets ,  such that the probability spaces ,  are isomorphic (being endowed naturally with sigma-fields and probability measures).

Standard probability space 
A probability space is standard, if it is isomorphic  to an interval with Lebesgue measure, a finite or countable set of atoms, or a combination (disjoint union) of both.

In  the measure is assumed finite, not necessarily probabilistic. In  atoms are not allowed.

Examples of non-standard probability spaces

A naive white noise 
The space of all functions  may be thought of as the product  of a continuum of copies of the real line . One may endow  with a probability measure, say, the standard normal distribution , and treat the space of functions as the product  of a continuum of identical probability spaces . Naively it might seem that  describes white noise.

However, the integral of a white noise function from 0 to 1 should be a random variable distributed N(0, 1). Indeed, if X is a random variable distributed (say) uniformly on (0, 1) and independent of ƒ, then ƒ(X) is not a random variable at all (it lacks measurability).

A perforated interval 
Let  be a set whose inner Lebesgue measure is equal to 0, but outer Lebesgue measure is equal to 1 (thus,  is nonmeasurable to extreme). There exists a probability measure  on  such that  for every Lebesgue measurable . (Here  is the Lebesgue measure.) Events and random variables on the probability space  (treated ) are in a natural one-to-one correspondence with events and random variables on the probability space  .

However, it is not. The conditional measure, given , is just a single atom (at ), provided that  is the underlying probability space. However, if  is used instead, then the conditional measure does not exist when .

A perforated circle is constructed similarly. Its events and random variables are the same as on the usual circle. The group of rotations acts on them naturally. However, it fails to act on the perforated circle.

See also .

A superfluous measurable set 
Let  be as in the previous example.
 
gives the general form of a probability measure  on  that extends the Lebesgue measure; here  is a parameter. To be specific, we choose  It might seem that such an extension of the Lebesgue measure is at least harmless.

However, it is the perforated interval in disguise. The map
 

 
another set of inner Lebesgue measure 0 but outer Lebesgue measure 1.

See also .

A criterion of standardness 
It may be convenient to examine a random variable  a random vector  a random sequence  or a sequence of events  treated as a sequence of two-valued random variables, 

Below it is assumed that such  is given. The question of its existence will be addressed afterwards.

The probability space  is assumed to be complete (otherwise it cannot be standard).

A single random variable 
A measurable function  induces a pushforward measure , – the probability measure  on  defined by
     for Borel sets  
i.e. the distribution of the random variable . The image  is always a set of full outer measure,
 
but its inner measure can differ (see a perforated interval). In other words,  need not be a set of full measure 

Theorem. Let a measurable function  be injective and generating, then the following two conditions are equivalent:
  (i.e. the inner measure has also full measure, and the image  is measureable with respect to the completion);
  is a standard probability space.

See also .

A random vector 
The same theorem holds for any  (in place of ).

A random sequence 
The theorem still holds for the space  of infinite sequences.

A sequence of events 
In particular, if the random variables  take on only two values 0 and 1, we deal with a measurable function  and a sequence of sets  The function  is generating if and only if  is the completion of the σ-algebra generated by 

In the pioneering work  sequences  that correspond to injective, generating  are called bases of the probability space  (see ). A basis is called complete mod 0, if  is of full measure  see . In the same section Rokhlin proved that if a probability space is complete mod 0 with respect to some basis, then it is complete mod 0 with respect to every other basis, and defines Lebesgue spaces by this completeness property.

Additional remarks 

Every injective measurable function from a standard probability space to a standard measurable space is generating. This property does not hold for the non-standard probability space dealt with in the subsection "A superfluous measurable set" above.

Caution.   The property of being countably generated is invariant under mod 0 isomorphisms, but the property of being countably separated is not. In fact, a standard probability space  is countably separated if and only if the cardinality of  does not exceed continuum (see ). A standard probability space may contain a null set of any cardinality, thus, it need not be countably separated. However, it always contains a countably separated subset of full measure.

Equivalent definitions 
Let  be a complete probability space such that the cardinality of  does not exceed continuum (the general case is reduced to this special case, see the caution above).

Via absolute measurability 
Definition.    is standard if it is countably separated, countably generated, and absolutely measurable.

"Absolutely measurable" means: measurable in every countably separated, countably generated probability space containing it.

Via perfectness 
Definition.    is standard if it is countably separated and perfect.

See .

Via topology 
Definition.    is standard if there exists a topology  on  such that
 the topological space  is metrizable;
 for every  there exists a compact set  in  such that 

See .

Verifying the standardness 
Every probability distribution on the space  turns it into a standard probability space. (Here, a probability distribution means a probability measure defined initially on the Borel sigma-algebra and completed.)

For example, the Wiener measure turns the Polish space  (of all continuous functions  endowed with the topology of local uniform convergence) into a standard probability space.

Another example: for every sequence of random variables, their joint distribution turns the Polish space  (of sequences; endowed with the product topology) into a standard probability space.

(Thus, the idea of dimension, very natural for topological spaces, is utterly inappropriate for standard probability spaces.)

The product of two standard probability spaces is a standard probability space.

A measurable subset of a standard probability space is a standard probability space. It is assumed that the set is not a null set, and is endowed with the conditional measure.

Every probability measure on a standard Borel space turns it into a standard probability space.

Using the standardness

Regular conditional probabilities 
In the discrete setup, the conditional probability is another probability measure, and the conditional expectation may be treated as the (usual) expectation with respect to the conditional measure, see conditional expectation. In the non-discrete setup, conditioning is often treated indirectly, since the condition may have probability 0, see conditional expectation. As a result, a number of well-known facts have special 'conditional' counterparts. For example: linearity of the expectation; Jensen's inequality (see conditional expectation); Hölder's inequality; the monotone convergence theorem, etc.

Given a random variable  on a probability space , it is natural to try constructing a conditional measure , that is, the conditional distribution of  given . In general this is impossible (see ). However, for a standard probability space  this is possible, and well known as canonical system of measures (see ), which is basically the same as conditional probability measures (see ), disintegration of measure (see ), and regular conditional probabilities (see ).

The conditional Jensen's inequality is just the (usual) Jensen's inequality applied to the conditional measure. The same holds for many other facts.

Measure preserving transformations 
Given two probability spaces ,  and a measure preserving map , the image  need not cover the whole , it may miss a null set. It may seem that  has to be equal to 1, but it is not so. However, if the probability spaces ,  are standard  then , see . If  is also one-to-one then every  satisfies , . Therefore,  is measurable (and measure preserving). See also .

"There is a coherent way to ignore the sets of measure 0 in a measure space" . Striving to get rid of null sets, mathematicians often use equivalence classes of measurable sets or functions. Equivalence classes of measurable subsets of a probability space form a normed complete Boolean algebra called the measure algebra (or metric structure).

It may seem that every homomorphism of measure algebras has to correspond to some measure preserving map, but it is not so.

See also

Notes

References

. Translated from Russian: .
.
.
.
.
.
.
.
.
.
.
.

Experiment (probability theory)
Measure theory